Nukufilm OÜ is an animation studio in Tallinn, Estonia. This studio is the biggest stop-motion animation studio in Northern Europe.

The studio was established in 1957.

In 1993, the studio was disjointed from Tallinnfilm. Since 1993, the studio's director is Arvo Nuut.

Produced animated films
During its existence of over 60 years, the studio is produced over 200 animated films (for full list, see list of Estonian animated films).

References

External links
 
 Nukufilm OÜ, entry in Estonian Film Database

Film production companies of Estonia